Lopus decolor is a species of plant bug in the family Miridae. It is found in Africa, Europe and Northern Asia (excluding China), North America, and New Zealand.

References

Further reading

 

Phylinae
Articles created by Qbugbot
Insects described in 1807